Elkhabar is a daily newspaper in Algeria published seven days a week in the tabloid format. It is one of the most widely read Algerian newspapers.

El Khabar′s web service publishes selected news in Arabic and French, with a minor section in English, though often poorly translated.

History and profile
After the fall of Algeria's one-party system in 1988, which tightly controlled the press, a group of young journalist issued the first edition of El Khabar in Algiers on 1 November 1990. The daily which has an independent stance is published in the tabloid format.

In August 2003 El Khabar temporarily ceased publication due to its debt to state-run printing presses.

The paper's online version  was the sixth most visited website for 2010 in the MENA region.

Political views and controversies
The paper is independent and has no party affiliation. The paper's critical reporting has resulted in numerous run-ins with the Algerian government, which on a couple of occasions has sent reporters and editors to jail. El Khabar staff was also threatened and attacked by Islamist rebels during Algeria's civil war, which began in 1992 and ended in 2002.

Notable journalists
 Mohamed Cherak (1977–2018)
 Othmane Senadjki (1959–2010)

See also
 List of newspapers in Algeria

References

External links 
The Arabic edition
Khabars.net
Khabars.in

1990 establishments in Algeria
Newspapers published in Algeria
Arabic-language newspapers
Publications established in 1990
Mass media in Algiers